The Campeonato Baiano Second Division are the second tier level of the football tournaments for the Bahia state league. The competitions are organized by the Bahia Football Federation. Usually, the champions of a division are promoted in the next year to the immediately upper level.

History

The Second Level of the Bahia State Championship is competed since 1922, and was not held from 1924 to 1934, in 1938, from 1942 to 1964, in 1966, in 1969, in 1970, from 1972 to 1974, from 1976 to 1980 and in 2005.

Competition format

The 2020 Second Level was competed by six clubs which played against each other twice. The two best placed clubs qualified to the final. In the final the two clubs played against each other twice, and the champion of the competition was promoted to the following year's first level.

Participants
2022 edition

List of champions
The table below shows the lower level champions of Baiano State Championship.

Names change
Atlanta is the currently Doce Mel.

Titles by team

Teams in bold stills active.

By city

See also
Campeonato Baiano
Campeonato Baiano Third Division

References

External links
 Federação Bahiana de Futebol official website